Thomaz Bellucci was the defending champion but lost in the first round to Gastão Elias.

Nicola Kuhn won the title after Viktor Galović retired trailing 6–2, 5–7, 2–4 in the final.

Seeds

Draw

Finals

Top half

Bottom half

References
Main Draw
Qualifying Draw

Sparkassen Open - Singles
2017 Singles